Deforestation in Nepal has always been a serious issue, which has a severe effect on the lives of poor people. In the past, Nepal was a widely forested nation. However now with the requirement for the extension of rural areas, migration of hills people to the plains, the developing regional interest for timber, and the local residents dependence on firewood as the essential source of energy, less than 30% of the nation's forest cover remains. Due to the continuous deforestation in Nepal, many people and creatures are dying. Around 70 percent of the people in Nepal work in agriculture, even if it is difficult to farm in the prevailing unfavourable weather conditions.

Rate of deforestation 
Between 1990 and 2000, Nepal lost an average of 91,700 hectares of forest per year. This amounts to an average annual deforestation rate of 1.90%. However, between 2000 and 2005, the rate of deforestation decreased by 28.9% to 1.35% per year. In total, between 1990 and 2005, Nepal lost 24.5% of its forest cover, or around 1,181,000 hectares. 42,000 hectares of its primary forest cover was last during that time. Deforestation rates of primary cover have decreased 10.7% since the close of the 1990s. Measuring the total rate of habitat conversion (defined as change in forest area plus change in woodland area minus net plantation expansion) for the 1990-2005 interval, Nepal lost 7.9% of its forest and woodland habitat.

Smuggling of timber 
Nepal has fallen victim to illegal timber processing in many of Nepal's forests. These timber operations illegally smuggle wood into India. Sources say that the smuggling is being done on both major roads and back roads. Nepal's forest administration has confiscated many trucks and tractors laden with timber from Nepal's forests.

Biodiversity effects of Nepal 

Biodiversity and Protected Areas are at risk due to deforestation. The country of Nepal has 1240 known species of amphibians, birds, mammals and reptiles according to figures from the World Conservation Monitoring Centre. Of this population 2.9% are endemic, meaning they exist in no other country, and 5.6% are threatened. In addition, Nepal is home to at least 6973 species of plants, of which 4.5% are native to the country itself. Not to mention, Nepal's bamboo forests are home to the Red Panda, a threatened species, found very few places in the world. These animals are even more prone to extinction with the high level of deforestation occurring.

Government regulation 
In the past, a government decision to nationalize and take over popular management of what were perceived as private forests in 1957 proved disastrous, partly because protectionist practices undercut indigenous management systems. The state faced rampant deforestation and degradation, and consequently devastating floods, according to Ghan Shyam Pandey, coordinator of the Global Alliance of Community Forestry (GACF), a Nepal-based network representing forest communities. It wasn't until the mid-1970s that those in power realized peoples' participation was key for conservation and securing livelihoods, and started the first forays into community-based forest management. Community Forestry Users Groups (CFUGs) were established with the aim of stewarding the land and using its resources sustainably.

Economic impact of deforestation in Nepal 
Climate change, deforestation and land grabbing don't only threaten Nepal's rich biodiversity, but the economic well-being of millions of its citizens. These community based forests that are falling victim to deforestion through smuggling and other industries hold potential economic value to its natives. With around 40 percent of the country covered in forest and shrubland, millions of rural Nepalese rely on forest biodiversity for subsistence, and as a source of income. Agriculture, including forestry, employs around 80 percent of the population.

Government and civil society in Nepal have been working to insure conservation by giving communities a share of the spoils helping steward the land. 

The process of marketing local products has become difficult. When community forestry produces local food or local products, they find it difficult to compete on local and national markets. Big companies dominate over local products. The stability and fertility of the agricultural land depend absolutely on the maintenance of a healthy forest. It has been estimated that a forest area three times the arable area may be necessary for the maintenance of the agricultural system as a whole.

Yet over the last decades the forest area has declined dramatically, and the trend is continuing. The problem of deforestation in Nepal is not one of exploitation by outsiders; there are almost no roads in the Hills, and logging on a commercial scale would not be feasible. The problem stems rather from the acute and increasing pressure on the land. The Hill population is now estimated at 1,500 people per square kilometer of cultivable land, with livestock numbers comparable to the human population.

Throughout the Hill districts of Nepal the cycle of environmental degradation  is clear. Land that once supported healthy regenerating 
forest is now covered with scrubby, largely unpalatable bush vegetation in which continuous overgrazing and lopping for fodder has prevented any regeneration and gradually removed the valuable edible species. Women have to walk farther and farther to collect fuel and fodder for the family's needs; in many parts of the district the round trip takes a full day. In local markets and centers of population a backload of wood may sell for the equivalent of two days' wages.

As the productivity of the forest declines through relentless overcutting, its ability to provide nutrients to the arable fields, through fodder and leaf litter, is also reduced, and crop yields start to fall. This, combined with direct population pressure, pushes cultivation on to steep and marginal land, greatly increasing the risk of landslides and soil erosion. In Doti, a district typical of the remote far west of the country, monsoon floods in 1983 did unprecedented and permanent damage to the land. Old farmers remembered similar rains, but the recent imbalance between forest and cultivated land makes the effects this time far more severe.

See also 

 Environmental issues in Nepal

References

Nepal
Environment of Nepal
Forestry in Nepal
Forests of Nepal